The 2001 European Promotion Cup for Junior Women was the third edition of the basketball European Promotion Cup for U18 women's teams, today known as FIBA U18 Women's European Championship Division C. It was played in Nicosia, Cyprus, from 18 to 22 July 2001. The host team, Cyprus, won the tournament.

Participating teams

First round

Group A

Group B

5th–7th place classification

Playoffs

Final standings

References

2001
2001–02 in European women's basketball
FIBA U18
Sports competitions in Cyprus
FIBA